Robert Gary Giltinan OAM (born 4 July 1949) is a former professional tennis player who was a grass court specialist. He won one singles title and two doubles titles over a twelve-year career spanning the introduction of the open era in 1968 to 1979. He reached a career-high ranking of World No. 16.

Giltinan is a direct relative of notable Australian entrepreneur James Joseph Giltinan (J J Giltinan), who helped found the sport of rugby league football in Australia, and also what is now effectively the world championships for 18 ft skiff class yachts, the JJ Giltinan International Trophy, contested each year on Sydney Harbour.

Tennis career
Beginning his tennis career in the 1960s, it was halted for two years when he completed National Service with the Australian Army during the Vietnam War.

He won one singles title at Surbiton in 1974, defeating Syd Ball in straight sets, and reached the final of Newport in 1973, falling to Roger Taylor of Great Britain 8–9 6–8. Giltinan was a member of the winning 1973 and 1977 Australian Davis Cup squads. He also represented the Cleveland Nets in World Team Tennis during the 1970s, partnering Björn Borg, Marty Riessen and Martina Navratilova. During the team's only season as the Cleveland-Pittsburgh Nets in 1977, he was the radio play-by-play voice on WWWE instead of being an active player.

Giltinan is best known for his run into the singles semi-finals of the 1977 Australian Open as a qualifier, where he would lose to John Lloyd of Great Britain. This run matches the best performance of any male qualifier in a Grand Slam. His other notable singles Grand Slam performance was his loss to John Alexander in four sets in the quarter-finals of the 1973 Australian Open. 

Giltinan's best Grand Slam doubles forays include a three set loss with Syd Ball to Ross Case and Geoff Masters in the 1973 Australian Open final, after defeating the far more famous pairing of Roche/Newcombe 6–4, 5–7, 12–10 in the semi-finals. He and Syd Ball also reached the 1970 Australian Open semi-finals, falling to John Alexander and Phil Dent 11–9 3–6, 4–6, 2–6.

Giltinan won 2 doubles titles in his career. In 1978, he and Colin Dibley defeated Marcello Lara and Eliot Teltscher at the 1978 Columbus Open in straight sets. Unlike his other titles, this was on clay. In 1979, Giltinan and Phil Dent defeated Ion Ţiriac and Guillermo Vilas in the final of Hobart. Also notable is their defeat of Mark Edmondson and John Marks in the semi-finals.

Aside from the finals at the Australian Open, Giltinan reached one other doubles final. In 1978, he and Colin Dibley were defeated by Tim Gullikson and Tom Gullikson at Newport.

Later life
On 28 July 2000, Giltinan was awarded the Australian Sports Medal for service as a "Previous player, coach and manager of elite players. Has been NSW state coach and national selector". He was also awarded the Australian Defence Medal.

In September 2008, Giltinan stood as an independent candidate for B Ward (Comprising Manly Vale, Seaforth, Freshwater and Curl Curl) of Warringah Council for a four-year term and was elected on 13 September 2008 with 21.2% of the ward vote (the highest of the 9 tickets). He was re-elected to B Ward at the 2012 local government elections on 8 September 2012 with 25.1% of the vote (the second-highest of 6 tickets), after which he was elected Deputy Mayor for a single term (2012–2013). 

With the amalgamation of Warringah Council into Northern Beaches Council on 12 May 2016, Giltinan ceased being a Councillor but was appointed by Administrator Dick Persson to serve on one of the advisory committees set up from former Councillors to advise the new Council. In 2017, Giltinan announced his independent ticket for the Curl Curl Ward of Northern Beaches Council. At the first elections for the council on 9 September 2017, Giltinan's ticket, the only non-registered political party ticket, received 12% of the vote in Curl Curl Ward (the lowest of the five ward tickets) and was not elected.

On 10 June 2019, Giltinan was awarded the Medal of the Order of Australia (OAM) for "service to tennis, and to the community of the Northern Beaches".

Career titles

Singles (1)

Doubles (2)

Honours and awards

References

External links
 
 

Australian male tennis players
Independent politicians in Australia
New South Wales local councillors
Deputy mayors of places in Australia
Tennis players from Sydney
Recipients of the Australian Sports Medal
1949 births
Living people